Rondvasshøgde  is a mountain ridge in Innlandet county, Norway. The ridge is located in Sel Municipality although one end of the ridge extends across the border into Folldal Municipality. The ridge consists of 3 main peaks: Rondvasshøgde Sentraltopp, Rondvasshøgde Øst, and Rondvasshøgde Øst 2. The mountain is surrounded by several other notable mountains including Veslsvulten to the east, Hornflågene to the southeast, Simlepiggen to the southwest, and Storronden and Svartnuten to the west. 

Rondvasshøgde Sentraltopp measures  and it sits towards the western end of the ridge, just east of the mountain Storronden. Rondvasshøgde Øst measures  (the tallest of the three peaks) and this sits between the other two peaks. Rondvasshøgde Øst 2 measures  and this sits on the municipal border between Sel and Folldal. The mountain Veslsvulten lies just east of this peak.

Name
Many of the mountains near the lake were then named after this lake.

See also
List of mountains of Norway

References

Mountains of Innlandet
Folldal
Sel